Stephen Brock Blomberg (born March 21, 1967) is the 7th president of California Institute of Integral Studies. A macroeconomist and former Professor of economics at Claremont McKenna College, Blomberg is best known in academia for his work on the economics of terrorism.

Early life and education
Blomberg was born in El Paso, Texas, the son of an Army officer. He graduated from the University of Tampa magna cum laude with a Bachelor of Science, then received his Master of Arts and Doctor of Philosophy degrees in economics from Johns Hopkins University.

Career
Blomberg was on the economics faculty of Wellesley College from 1995 to 2003. In fall 2003, he joined the economics department at Claremont McKenna College. He became the Dean of the Robert Day School of Economics and Finance at Claremont McKenna in June 2010.

Blomberg was named president of Ursinus College on April 30, 2015, and was inaugurated on October 16, 2015. In 2017, Blomberg's total compensation was $474,172.00, making him the 21st highest paid private college president in Pennsylvania.

On June 23, 2021, Blomberg announced that he was leaving Ursinus to become president of California Institute of Integral Studies on September 1.

Selected works

References

External links
Ursinus College President's Office

Economists from California
1967 births
Living people
University of Tampa alumni
Johns Hopkins University alumni
Claremont McKenna College faculty
21st-century American economists